Steven Willard Moore (born November 6, 1958) is a retired NASCAR driver from Carrollton, Georgia.  In his 18 race career from 1977–1988, he primarily drove a No. 73 Pontiac/Chevrolet owned by his family.

Winston Cup Series 
Moore made his first NASCAR Winston Cup Series start at the age of 18 at Talladega Superspeedway in 1977 driving the No. 07 Chevrolet for Norris Price. He finished a respectable 19th place in that race. He raced once each year after that, until 1980 when he raced in 4 Winston Cup Races for his family-owned team. He had a best finish in 1980 of 13th at Atlanta Motor Speedway. 1981 saw Steve Moore attempting to make the Daytona 500. A 17th-place finish in the First UNO Twin 125 race would not be enough to get into the prestigious event. Moore struggled in 1982, only finishing one of the 4 races that he entered. Steve made two starts in 1983 at Talladega and Michigan. In 1984 Moore once again tried to make the Daytona 500, but was involved in a savage crash in his qualifying race on the 22nd lap. He raced sporadically until 1988, the year he raced his final Winston Cup races. He drove for Roger Hamby in three races, including the Daytona 500, a race Moore had been trying to make for five years.

ARCA
Moore raced in one ARCA Permatex SuperCar Series race in his career, that came in 1986 at Talladega. Driving his No. 76 Domino's Pizza Chevrolet. Moore was involved in a one lap accident and failed to finish.

References

External links
 

1958 births
Living people
People from Carrollton, Georgia
Sportspeople from the Atlanta metropolitan area
Racing drivers from Georgia (U.S. state)
American Speed Association drivers
NASCAR drivers